Mystic Marriage of Saint Catherine is an oil on canvas painting by Moretto da Brescia, executed c. 1543, on display on a side altar in the Church of San Clemente in Brescia. In the upper register are Catherine of Alexandria, the Madonna and Child and Catherine of Siena, whilst below are Paul and Jerome.

References

1543 paintings
Paintings by Moretto da Brescia
Paintings in Brescia
Moretto
Paintings depicting Paul the Apostle
Paintings of Jerome
Paintings of Catherine of Siena
Paintings of the Madonna and Child by Moretto da Brescia